Day & Nightdriving is the seventh and final studio album by American post-grunge band Seven Mary Three.  It was released in 2008 on Bellum Records. The album's lead single was "Last Kiss".

Production
The album arose from acoustic jam sessions between guitarists Jason Ross and Thomas Juliano, leading to Day & Nightdriving'''s country-rock sound.

Critical receptionThe Courier-Journal wrote that "the album turns slightly with the Wilco-esque 'Dreaming Against Me', which invites the listener to sing out loud, while 'Hammer & a Stone', with its acoustic guitar set against piano, is simply beautiful." Goldmine'' called the album "one of the most pleasant surprises of 2008," writing that the band "has tapped into a rootsy side previously only hinted at."

Track listing
All songs written by Jason Ross, except where noted.

"Last Kiss" – 3:58
"Laughing Out Loud" (Ross/Juliano) – 3:19
"Was a Ghost" (Ross/Juliano) – 3:46
"Dreaming Against Me" – 3:04
"Hammer & a Stone" – 4:13
"Break the Spell" – 3:59
"You Think Too Much" (Ross/Juliano) – 3:45
"Strangely at Home Here" – 3:46
"She Wants Results" – 3:57
"Upside Down" (Ross/Juliano) – 3:55
"Dead Days in the Kitchen" (Ross/Juliano) – 3:53
"Things I Stole" – 2:52

Album credits
 Jason Ross – lead vocals, rhythm guitar
 Thomas Juliano – lead guitar, backing vocals
 Casey Daniel – bass
 Giti Khalsa – drums
 Brian Paulson – keyboards
 Lee Waters – drums on "Last Kiss" and "Laughing Out Loud"
 The Poplar Sisters – backing vocals on "Stomps on "Dreaming Against Me"

Production
Producers: Jason Ross, Thomas Juliano, and Brian Paulson
Engineering: Brian Paulson and Thomas Juliano
Mixing: Brian Paulson
Mastering: Alan Douches
Art Direction: Lane Wurster
Graphic Design: Phillip Dwyer
Photography: Josh Rothstein

References

2008 albums
Albums produced by Brian Paulson
Seven Mary Three albums